Port-Salut Airport  is an airport serving Port-Salut, a coastal commune in the Sud Department of Haiti.

See also
Transport in Haiti
List of airports in Haiti

References

External links
OpenStreetMap - Port-Salut

Airports in Haiti